Region growing is a simple region-based image segmentation method. It is also classified as a pixel-based image segmentation method since it involves the selection of initial seed points.

This approach to segmentation examines neighboring pixels of initial seed points and determines whether the pixel neighbors should be added to the region. The process is iterated on, in the same manner as general data clustering algorithms. A general discussion of the region growing algorithm is described below.

Region-based segmentation
The main goal of segmentation is to partition an image into regions. Some segmentation methods such as thresholding achieve this goal by looking for the boundaries between regions based on discontinuities in grayscale or color properties. Region-based segmentation is a technique for determining the region directly. The basic formulation is:

 

 

 

(a) means that the segmentation must be complete; that is, every pixel must be in a region.

(b) requires that points in a region must be connected in some predefined sense.

(c) indicates that the regions must be disjoint.

(d) deals with the properties that must be satisfied by the pixels in a segmented region. For example,  if all pixels in  have the same grayscale.

Basic concept of seed points

The first step in region growing is to select a set of seed points. Seed point selection is based on some user criterion (for example, pixels in a certain grayscale range, pixels evenly spaced on a grid, etc.). The initial region begins as the exact location of these seeds.

The regions are then grown from these seed points to adjacent points depending on a region membership criterion. The criterion could be, for example, pixel intensity, grayscale texture, or colour.

Since the regions are grown on the basis of the criterion, the image information itself is important. For example, if the criterion were a pixel intensity threshold value, knowledge of the histogram of the image would be of use, as one could use it to determine a suitable threshold value for the region membership criterion.

One can use 4-connected neighborhood to grow from the seed points. An alternative for pixels adjacent relationship is the 8-connected neighborhood. Pixels adjacent to the seed points are examined and classified into the seed points if they have the same intensity value. It is an iterated process until there are no change in two successive iterative stages. Other criteria can be chosen; the main goal is to classify the similarity of the image into regions.

Important issues

Suitable selection of seed points 
 
The selection of seed points is depending on the users. For example, in a grayscale lightning image, we may want to segment the lightning from the background. Then probably, we can examine the histogram and choose the seed points from the highest range of it.

More information of the image is better 

Obviously, the connectivity or pixel adjacent information is helpful for us to determine the threshold and seed points.

Minimum area threshold 

No region in region growing method result will be smaller than this threshold in the segmented image.

Similarity threshold value 

If the difference of pixel-value or the difference value of average grayscale of a set of pixels less than “Similarity threshold value”, the regions will be considered as a same region.

The criteria of similarities or so called homogeneity we choose are also important. It usually depends on the original image and the segmentation result we want.

Some criteria often used are grayscale (average intensity or variance), color, and texture or shape.

Advantages and disadvantages

Advantages 
 Can correctly separate the regions that have the same properties we define.
 Can provide the original images which have clear edges with good segmentation results.
 Simple concept: only need a small number of seed points to represent the property we want, then grow the region.
 Can determine the seed points and the criteria we want to make.
 Can choose the multiple criteria at the same time.
 Theoretical very efficient due to visiting each pixel by a limited bound of times.

Disadvantages 
 Unless image has had a threshold function applied, a continuous path of points related to color may exist, which connects any two points in the image.
 Practically random memory access slows down the algorithm, so adaption might be needed

See also
 k-means clustering
 Watershed (image processing)

Notes

References
  Jian-Jiun Ding, The class of "Time-Frequency Analysis and Wavelet Transform", the Department of Electrical Engineering, National Taiwan University (NTU), Taipei, Taiwan, 2007.
  Jian-Jiun Ding, The class of "Advanced Digital Signal Processing", the Department of Electrical Engineering, National Taiwan University (NTU), Taipei, Taiwan, 2008.
  W. K. Pratt, Digital Image Processing 4th Edition, John Wiley & Sons, Inc., Los Altos, California, 2007
  M. Petrou and P. Bosdogianni, Image Processing the Fundamentals, Wiley, UK, 2004.
  R. C. Gonzalez and R.E. Woods, Digital Image Processing 2nd Edition, Prentice Hall, New Jersey, 2002.

Image segmentation